Balçova (pronounced Balchova), is a district of Izmir Province in Turkey. It is one of the eleven districts in the Greater Metropolitan Area of Izmir, the smallest in terms of area. Balçova is a fully urbanized at the rate of 100,0 per cent and the center has no depending townships with own municipalities or villages. Balçova district further neighbors the district area Narlıdere to the south and the west, both of its neighbors being among Izmir's metropolitan districts. Balçova district's overall levels of education are among the highest in Turkey, the literacy rate reaching 98 per cent, while the calculations for average yearly income per inhabitant situate it slightly below the national average, at 4.327 US Dollars, for which its open approach to outside immigration may have played a role. The overall appearance of Balçova leaves the impression of a locality where people are generally educated and who subsist on mid-revenues. The economy is largely based on commerce and tourism, its three shopping malls constituting the backbone for the first range of activities, and its thermal baths for the second. New housing projects putting Balçova's advantageous location to benefit and generally aimed at mid- to higher- income residents started to be built in recent years and as such, Balçova became in recent years one of Izmir's metropolitan districts where the economy grew the fastest. Balçova is home to Izmir University of Economics.

Agamemnon Baths
The baths are well-known since antiquity and the name ancient, and makes reference to a contingent of Greeks under Agamemnon during the Trojan War who were led by an oracle to the warm springs to heal their wounds after a battle. Aelius Aristides had also frequently resorted in the baths and had reported that it was here that Asclepius had first began to prophesy.

A number of sulfurous hot springs rise in and around a small stream, which previously dried up in summer, but which is now kept in service all year round thanks to modern installations centered around a five-star hotel. The waters, of a temperature of to 160 degrees Fahrenheit, are considered good for rheumatism, sciatica, gallstones and eczema. The baths are remain extremely popular both by themselves and by the thermal establishment's having extended its range of activities also in the field of congress and exhibition tourism.

Visitor attractions

Two decommissioned ships of the Turkish Navy, a submarine and a frigate, are the main attractions of the İnciralti Sea Museum. The Balçova Gondola operates on a nearby hill.

Resources

External links

 İzmir Metropolitan Municipality

Footnotes

 
Populated coastal places in Turkey
Populated places in İzmir Province
Districts of İzmir Province